James Harkness is a Scottish actor. He is known for his roles as Craig Myers in the BBC crime drama The Victim (2019), as James in BBC drama The Nest (2020) and footballer Jimmy Love in the Netflix drama The English Game (2020) and the Sky Original "Gangs of London".

Early life
Harkeness was raised by his mother in a deprived household in the Gorbals area of Glasgow. He studied at King's Park Secondary School and took an interest in drama from an early childhood. At the age of 18 he suffered arm injuries from being struck with an axe (a weapon he brought to a confrontation relating to a stolen mobile phone), which later caused panic attacks when he passed the location of the incident 
– Pollokshaws – or even saw someone walking with a phone.

Harkness was chosen by BAFTA as part of their BAFTA Elevate 2019 group programme which provides a support and network to aspiring young actors.

Filmography

References

External links
 

21st-century Scottish male actors
Living people
Scottish male film actors
Scottish male stage actors
Scottish male television actors
Male actors from Glasgow
People educated at Kings Park Secondary School
People from Gorbals
Year of birth missing (living people)